Conasprella culebrana is a species of sea snail, a marine gastropod mollusk in the family Conidae, the cone snails and their allies.

Distribution
This marine species was found off Culebra, Puerto Rico.

References

External links
 Gastropods.com: Conasprella (Ximeniconus) culebranus

culebrana
Gastropods described in 2016